Raising Cane's River Center (originally named the Riverside Centroplex and later the Baton Rouge River Center) is an entertainment complex in downtown Baton Rouge, Louisiana. Opened in 1977, the complex includes: an arena, ballroom, exhibition center, theatre and library. The venue hosts over 500 events per year. In 2016, Raising Cane's Chicken Fingers signed a 10-year naming rights agreement for the River Center.

Venues

Raising Cane's Exhibition Hall
The Exhibition Hall provides a total of 70,000 square feet (7,000 m²) of convention or exhibit space after a 2011 expansion of an additional 10,000 sq ft (1,000 m²). This can be combined with the arena to create more than 100,000 square feet (10,000 m²) of contiguous convention or exhibit space.

Raising Cane's Grand Ballroom
The Grand Ballroom provides 26,150 square feet (2,429 m²) of multi-purpose space.

River Center Theater for Performing Arts
The Theatre for Performing Arts provides seating for up to 1,999 people. It is home to Opera Louisiane, the Baton Rouge Ballet Theatre and the Baton Rouge Symphony Orchestra. It is also used for theatre performances and musicals.

Arena

The Raising Cane's River Center Arena presents concerts, sporting events, theater events, trade shows, and family shows, with seating for up to 10,400 for concerts (permanent and floor seats), 8,900 for sporting events (permanent seats) and 4,500 for theatre events.

Teams
 ECHL Baton Rouge Kingfish (1996–2003)
 EISL Baton Rouge Bombers (1997–1998)
 IPFL Louisiana Bayou Beast (1999)
 af2 Baton Rouge Blaze (2001)
 FPHL Louisiana Pro Hockey (2023)

Gallery

See also
 List of concert halls
 List of convention centers in the United States
 List of music venues
 List of opera houses
 Theater in Louisiana

References

External links
 Official website

1977 establishments in Louisiana
Buildings and structures in Baton Rouge, Louisiana
Concert halls in Louisiana
Convention centers in Louisiana
Economy of Baton Rouge, Louisiana
Opera houses in Louisiana
Performing arts centers in Louisiana
Tourist attractions in Baton Rouge, Louisiana